Christoph Bach may refer to:

 Christoph Bach (musician) (1613–1661), German musician, grandfather of Johann Sebastian Bach
 Christoph Bach (actor) (born 1975), German actor